Jeremy M. Nobis (born August 31, 1970, in Madison, Wisconsin) is an American former alpine skier who competed in the 1994 Winter Olympics.

Nobis was one of the pioneers of the aggressive big mountain skiing that now dominates the industry. A star of many ski films by studios such as Warren Miller Entertainment, Teton Gravity Research and Matchstick Productions he is respected as a legend of the sport.

References

External links
 https://www.youtube.com/watch?v=4QFTIYthpiM

1970 births
Living people
American male alpine skiers
Olympic alpine skiers of the United States
Alpine skiers at the 1994 Winter Olympics